Viinistu is a village in Kuusalu Parish, Harju County in northern Estonia. Viinistu has a population of 148 (as of 1 January 2012).

Viinistu was first mentioned in 1372 as Wynest.

Businessman, politician and art collector Jaan Manitski (born 1942) was born in Viinistu and currently is the biggest employer in the village owning the art museum and a hotel.

Navy officer, diplomat and painter Aleksander Warma (1890–1970) was born in Viinistu.

Gallery

References

External links
Viinistu Culture and Conference Centre 

Villages in Harju County
Kuusalu Parish
Kreis Harrien